Damian Manusovich (born 30 April 1973 in Argentina) is an Argentinean retired footballer.

References

Living people
Association football defenders
1973 births
Argentine footballers
Elche CF players
San Lorenzo de Almagro footballers
Club Atlético Vélez Sarsfield footballers
Club Atlético Atlanta footballers